John Uniac (born March 29, 1971) is a Canadian retired professional ice hockey defenceman. He was drafted by the Montreal Canadiens in the 11th round (228th overall) of the 1990 NHL Entry Draft.

Uniac was selected first overall by the Sudbury Wolves in the 1987 Ontario Hockey League (OHL) Priority Selection and played major junior hockey in the OHL from 1987 to 1991 for the Sudbury Wolves and Kitchener Rangers.

Uniac went on to play five seasons in the ECHL where, between 1991 and 1997, he skated with the Winston-Salem Thunderbirds, Wheeling Thunderbirds, and Tallahassee Tiger Sharks, earning 11 goals, 60 assists, and 125 penalty minutes.

Career statistics

References

External links

Living people
1971 births
Canadian ice hockey defencemen
Kitchener Rangers players
Montreal Canadiens draft picks
Sudbury Wolves players
Tallahassee Tiger Sharks players
Wheeling Thunderbirds players
Winston-Salem Thunderbirds players
Sportspeople from Stratford, Ontario
Ice hockey people from Ontario